The BDI Thug is the debut solo studio album by American rapper Buckshot. It was released on October 26, 1999 via Duck Down Records. Production was handled by Mark "Boogie" Brown, Baby Paul, Chris Ward, DJ Akshun, Just Blaze, Lord Jamar, Master Beats and Buckshot himself, who also served as executive producer together with Drew "Dru-Ha" Friedman. It features guest appearances from BJ Swan, Blue Flame, FT, Half a Mill, Harly Hearts, Sweet Mellodye, Tone Capone and Top Dog. The album peaked at number 63 on the Top R&B/Hip-Hop Albums and number 21 on the Heatseekers Albums in the United States.

The album's title came from the nickname Tupac Shakur gave to Buckshot in the summer of 1996 during the recording of the unreleased 2Pac's One Nation album.

Track listing

Notes
 signifies an additional producer

Personnel
Kenyatta "Buckshot" Blake – executive producer
Drew "Dru-Ha" Friedman – executive producer
Leo "Swift" Morris – engineering (tracks: 2, 11)
Ed Miller – engineering (tracks: 3, 7, 10, 12)
Ronald Williams – engineering & mixing (track 5)
Ken Lewis – engineering (track 8)
DJ Eli – engineering (track 9)
Michael Sarsfield – mastering
Andre Simmons – artwork, design
Marc Ecko – artwork, design
Jen Petrashock – photography

Charts

References

External links

1999 debut albums
Duck Down Music albums
Buckshot (rapper) albums
Albums produced by Just Blaze